Pedro Miguel Mimoso Duarte (born 22 April 1978 in Setúbal) is a Portuguese retired footballer who played as a left back.

External links

1978 births
Living people
Sportspeople from Setúbal
Portuguese footballers
Association football defenders
Liga Portugal 2 players
Segunda Divisão players
F.C. Barreirense players
C.D. Montijo players
G.D. Estoril Praia players
Cypriot First Division players
Doxa Katokopias FC players
Olympiakos Nicosia players
Portuguese expatriate footballers
Expatriate footballers in Cyprus
Portuguese expatriate sportspeople in Cyprus